This list of Southwestern Athletic Conference baseball champions concerns the overall conference baseball championship of the National Collegiate Athletic Association Division I Southwestern Athletic Conference. The top four finishers in each conference division participate in a two-bracket, double-elimination tournament to determine the overall conference champion; it was most recently played in Birmingham, Alabama, between May 25 and May 29. The winner of the tournament also receives an automatic berth to the NCAA tournament and, since 2019, to the HBCU World Series.

History

Background
The SWAC was established in 1920, and the conference is known to have sponsored baseball as a league sport until around the uncertain times of the Great Depression and World World II before sanctioning it again in 1949 (even early SWAC power Wiley College shut down its baseball program after the 1932 season, despite featuring a rising young star infielder from the Chicago area in Pat Patterson). Between 1959 and 2003, only Southern, Jackson State, and Grambling State won SWAC championships. The league office itself has even been known to refer to these schools as the "Big Three." However, since 2004, seven programs have won championships, suggesting greater competitiveness in the league. Also, with the SWAC tournament now including eight schools, simply more lower-seeded teams have an opportunity to compete for the conference crown.

Determining conference champions
Though the league championship was normally determined by the regular season conference standings, for the first three seasons after the SWAC had renewed sponsorship of baseball in 1949, a championship series was held; the conference was divided into northern and southern divisions during that time period. In 1977 the league returned to division play—this time with eastern and western divisions (reflecting the changes in conference membership)—with the division winners again facing off in a best-of-three championship series. After the 1980 series featured a fourth consecutive JSU–SU match-up, the series was successfully converted into a more inclusive four-team, double-elimination tournament for the 1981 season, guaranteeing that at least one school that had never won the SWAC title before could compete in it (the four-team field was expanded to six teams in 2000 and eight teams in 2008).

Current status
A three-year deal was signed in 2020 to return the tournament to Smith–Wills Stadium in Jackson, Mississippi. However, just two weeks after that agreement was announced, the NCAA canceled all spring championship events for the 2020 season, due to the COVID-19 pandemic. Then, less than a month before the 2021 tournament, it was announced that it would be relocated from Jackson to Toyota Field in Madison, Alabama "due to enhanced COVID-19 protocols." The 2022 tournament was split between Regions Field and Jerry D. Young Memorial Field in Birmingham.

Champions

Conference championships by year
The following is a list of conference champions, organized by year. The league office apparently does not acknowledge titles earned prior to 1959 in its public releases. It is not immediately clear if this is due to space constraints or poor record-keeping—or if the conference simply does not consider pre-1959 titles as "official." At that time the SWAC began to change significantly with a shift in membership from smaller, private Christian colleges in and around Texas—many of whom are now members of the National Association of Intercollegiate Athletics's Red River Athletic Conference—to larger, secular public universities spread throughout the Deep South (Grambling and Jackson State were particularly notable additions, especially as far as baseball competition was concerned). Southern also won the NAIA World Series in 1959. The conference began changing demographically at that time as well, with southern universities beginning to integrate.

Note: in 1993 Jackson State and Southern were declared co-champions, due to weather forcing the cancellation of the SWAC baseball tournament final.

Conference championships by school

Western Division championships by school

Eastern Division championships by school

Note: in 2006 Jackson State initially clinched at least a share of the Eastern Division championship but, after forfeiting conference games for the use of ineligible players, fell behind Mississippi Valley State by the final division standings.

Northern Division championships by school

Southern Division championships by school

See also

 Southwestern Athletic Conference baseball tournament

References